Danny Hyungjun Kim (born 28 May 1998) is an Australian professional footballer who plays as a defensive midfielder for Bentleigh Greens.

Early life
Kim is the son of South Korean international defender Kim Pan-keun.

Playing career

Club
Kim signed a short-term loan deal for Brisbane Roar from Lions FC for the Roar's final games of the 2019–20 A-League season, following delays caused by the coronavirus pandemic in Australia.  Kim previously played for Brisbane Roar FC Youth prior to signing for Hume City in 2017. Kim returned to Lions FC at the end of the A-League season.

Geylang International 
On 16 July 2021, Danny Kim embarks his move to Southeast Asia by signing for the Singapore Premier League side, Geylang International FC. The 23-year-old midfielder will join Geylang International FC's vacant slot of the foreign players for the 2021 season. On 25th August 2021, Kim scored his 1st goal for Geylang International FC, scoring with a powerful shot from just outside the penalty box against Tampines Rovers. On 11 November 2021, he leaves Geylang International FC.

International
Kim has represented the Australian under-17 national side, and scored a long-range goal for the team in a win over Macau in 2014 AFC U-16 Championship qualification.

Career statistics

Club

Notes

References

External links

1998 births
Living people
Australian soccer players
Australia youth international soccer players
Association football midfielders
Hume City FC players
Queensland Lions FC players
Brisbane Roar FC players
National Premier Leagues players
A-League Men players
Australian people of South Korean descent